Raymond Léopold Bruckberger (10 April 1907, in Murat – 4 January 1998, in Fribourg), was a French Dominican priest, Résistance member, writer, translator, screenwriter and director of Austrian heritage.

He was elected member of the Académie des Sciences Morales et Politiques in 1985.

Publications
The blind clairvoyant with etchings of Elie Grekoff, Cluny, 1948.
Cossacks and the Holy Spirit, La Jeune Parque, 1951.
 One Sky To Share." The French and American Journals. 
Marie-Madeleine, La Jeune Parque, 1953, Albin Michel, 1975.
Essay on the American Republic, Gallimard, 1958.
We n 'go down to the woods, Amiot-Dumont, 1958.
The Story of Jesus Christ, Grasset and Fasquelle, 1965.
Spells Mexican SEDIMO, 1966.
The world upside down. For what I saw, Editions du Cerf, 1971.
God and Politics, Plon, 1971.
Saint Francis and the Wolf, GP Editions, 1971
Open Letter to Jesus Christ, Albin Michel, 1973.
Puss in Boots and Coat bishop, Plon, 1973.
Critical review, Minuit, 1976.
The Donkey and the Ox, Plon, 1976.
The whole Church clamor, Flammarion. 1977 (weekly column Thursday in L'Aurore in 1976 and 1977, and a few articles published in Le Journal du Dimanche .
You'll end up on the scaffold, Flammarion, 1978.
The Gospel new translation. Followed by: Simone Fabien, his faithful collaborator: Comments for the present time, Albin Michel, 1976 Price Chateaubriand .
Letter to John Paul II, Pope of 2000, stock, 1979.
The Bachaga, Flammarion, 1980.
I believe, Grasset, 1981.
The Revelation of Jesus Christ, Grasset and Fasquelle, 1983.
Open letter to those who have difficulty in France, Albin Michel, 1984.
Capitalism, but that's life! Plon, 1984.
Yes to the death penalty, Plon, 1985.
Bruck father the devil, Plon, 1986.
Bernanos alive, Albin Michel, 1988.
At a time when the shadows lengthen, Albin Michel, 1989.
Mary, mother of Jesus Christ, Albin Michel, 1991.

External links
Notice biographique de l'Académie des sciences morales et politiques
 

French Dominicans
Members of the Académie des sciences morales et politiques
French film directors
French Resistance members
French male screenwriters
20th-century French screenwriters
1907 births
1998 deaths
French people of Austrian descent
20th-century French translators
20th-century French male writers
French male non-fiction writers